The following is a list of independently distributed records to achieve the #1 spot on the Billboard 200 chart since 1991, when Nielsen Soundscan began recording album sales data.

Though not clearly defined, an independent record label is generally considered to be any label that is not part of the big three record companies, which consist of Sony Music Entertainment, Warner Music Group, and Universal Music Group. Billboard cites the following definition for use on their Top Independent Albums chart: "For Billboard charting purposes, defining an independent album is done on a title level and based on its distribution. If an album is sold by an indie distributor (or, one of the major label's indie distribution arms), it is classified as an independent title and can chart on our Top Independent Albums tally. Classification is not based on a label's ownership, or if an act is signed to an independent label." Note that this definition does not exclude record labels owned by other large corporations from being classified as independent: for example, Billboard considered Disney Music Group to be an independent label for over a decade, despite being part of The Walt Disney Company, the largest media and entertainment conglomerate in the world. Disney lost the distinction in 2000 when they signed a distribution deal with Universal.

Some of the independently released albums to have topped the Billboard 200, such as the Eagles' Long Road Out of Eden (2007), Radiohead's In Rainbows (2008), Pearl Jam's Backspacer (2009), and Frank Ocean's Blonde (2016) are from former major label acts who had developed strong and established fanbases from their time being signed to a major label.

In 2020, Billboard updated their eligibility rules for independent albums. As of the chart dated July 18, 2020, labels that are independently owned and control their masters, but which are distributed directly through one of the "Big Three" record companies (as opposed to a major label within one of the aforementioned companies), would be eligible for Top Independent Albums. This change retroactively classified many albums that had hit #1 on the Billboard 200 as "independent". For the sake of consistency, those albums, such as Taylor Swift's 1989 (Big Machine Records), Adele's 21 (XL Recordings), and the soundtrack to Frozen (Walt Disney Records), are not included in the list below.

Albums

N.W.A – Niggaz4Life (Ruthless Records/Priority Records), 1991
Ice Cube – The Predator (Priority Records/EMI), 1992
Various Artists – The Lion King Soundtrack (Walt Disney Records), 1994
Various Artists – Friday Soundtrack (Priority Records), 1995
Various Artists – Pocahontas Soundtrack (Walt Disney Records), 1995
Bone Thugs-N-Harmony – E 1999 Eternal (Ruthless Records), 1995
Tha Dogg Pound – Dogg Food (Death Row Records/Interscope), 1995
Bone Thugs-N-Harmony – The Art of War (Ruthless Records), 1997
Eagles – Long Road out of Eden (Eagles Recording Company II), 2007
Radiohead – In Rainbows (TBD Records/ATO Records), 2008
Pearl Jam – Backspacer (Monkeywrench Records), 2009
Vampire Weekend – Contra (XL Recordings), 2010
Various Artists – Hope for Haiti Now (MTV Networks), 2010
Arcade Fire – The Suburbs (Merge Records), 2010
Cake – Showroom of Compassion (Upbeat Records), 2011
Mac Miller – Blue Slide Park (Rostrum Records), 2011
Mumford & Sons – Babel (Glassnote Records), 2012
Jason Aldean – Night Train (Broken Bow Records), 2012
Vampire Weekend – Modern Vampires of the City (XL Recordings), 2013
Queens of the Stone Age – ...Like Clockwork (Matador Records), 2013
Garth Brooks – Blame It All on My Roots: Five Decades of Influences (Pearl Records), 2013
Lecrae – Anomaly (Reach Records), 2014
Jason Aldean – Old Boots, New Dirt (Broken Bow Records), 2014
Alabama Shakes – Sound & Color (ATO Records), 2015
Tyrese – Black Rose (Voltron Recordz/Caroline Records), 2015
Janet Jackson – Unbreakable (Rhythm Nation/BMG Rights Management), 2015
The Lumineers – Cleopatra (Dualtone Records), 2016
Blink-182 – California (Viking Wizard Eyes/BMG Rights Management), 2016
Frank Ocean – Blonde (Boys Don't Cry), 2016
Jason Aldean – They Don't Know (Macon Music/Broken Bow Records/BMG Rights Management), 2016
Metallica – Hardwired... to Self-Destruct (Blackened Recordings), 2016
Brand New – Science Fiction (Procrastinate! Music Traitors), 2017
NF – Perception (NF Real Music/Caroline Records), 2017 (considered an independent album despite the involvement of Capitol Christian Music Group, which is owned by Universal)
XXXTentacion – ? (Bad Vibes Forever), 2018
Jason Aldean – Rearview Town (Macon Music/Broken Bow Records/BMG Rights Management), 2018
BTS – Love Yourself: Tear (Big Hit Music), 2018
BTS – Love Yourself: Answer (Big Hit Music), 2018
XXXTentacion – Skins (Bad Vibes Forever/Empire Distribution), 2018
BTS – Map of the Soul: Persona (Big Hit Music), 2019
NF – The Search (NF Real Music/Caroline Records), 2019
Trippie Redd – A Love Letter to You 4 (TenThousand Projects), 2019
BTS – Map of the Soul: 7 (Big Hit Music), 2020
BTS – Be (Big Hit Music), 2020
Bad Bunny – El Último Tour Del Mundo (Rimas Entertainment), 2020
Adele – 25 (XL Recordings/Columbia Records), 2021 (hit #1 on Independent Albums six years after hitting #1 on the Billboard 200, only doing so after an already-mentioned rules change)
Various Artists – Encanto (Walt Disney Records), 2022
Bad Bunny – Un Verano Sin Ti (Rimas Entertainment), 2022

References

Independent